Parotis prasinophila is a moth in the family Crambidae. It was described by George Hampson in 1912. It is found in the Democratic Republic of the Congo (Orientale), Mozambique and South Africa.

References

Moths described in 1912
Spilomelinae